Palmer (Ahtna: Nił'etse'it'aade or Nuutah; Dena'ina: Denal'i Kena) is a city in and the borough seat of the Matanuska-Susitna Borough, Alaska, United States, located  northeast of Anchorage on the Glenn Highway in the Matanuska Valley.  It is the ninth-largest city in Alaska, and forms part of the Anchorage Metropolitan Statistical Area. As of the 2020 census, the population of the city is 5,888, down from 5,937 in 2010. 

Palmer hosts the annual Alaska State Fair, and is also the headquarters of the National Tsunami Warning Center.

History

The first people to live in the Matanuska Valley, where Palmer is located, were the Dena'ina and Ahtna Athabaskans. They moved throughout the area, living a subsistence lifestyle and trading with other native groups. Their trade routes were along the Matanuska River. Russians came to Alaska in 1741 and brought the Russian Orthodox religious tradition to the indigenous peoples of the region. In the early 1890s, an entrepreneur named George W. Palmer built a trading post on the Matanuska River, near present-day Palmer. The town was later named after Palmer.

In the late 19th century, the U.S. government began to take interest in the Matanuska coal fields located north of Palmer. This interest sparked financiers to consider constructing the Alaska Central Railroad in 1904. The advent of World War I created a need for high-quality coal to fuel U.S. battleships, and by 1917 the US Navy had constructed rail from the port of Seward to the Chickaloon coal deposits. At the end of World War I, the U.S. Navy distributed land in the coal fields to war veterans and additional land was opened to homesteading. Farmers, miners and homesteaders began to populate the area. The Palmer Post Office was opened July 6, 1917, under the name of Warton.  With railroad accessibility, new markets for agriculture began to open up for farmers in the Matanuska Valley.

In one year, Palmer transformed from a mere whistle stop rail siding to a planned community with modern utilities and community services.  Eleven million dollars from Federal Emergency Relief Administration was spent to create the town of Palmer and relocate 203 families from the hard hit Iron Range region of Michigan, Minnesota and Wisconsin. Families traveled by train and ship to Palmer, arriving in May 1935. Upon their arrival they were housed in a city tent during their first Alaskan summer. Each family drew lots for  tracts and their farming adventure began in earnest. The failure rate was high, but many of their descendants still live in the area and there are still many operating farms in the Palmer area, including the Vanderwheele and Wolverine farms. In 1971, the National Outdoor Leadership School started operating wilderness education courses in the nearby Talkeetna and Chugach mountain ranges from a local historic farmhouse, the Berry House, which is currently listed on the National Register of Historic Places.

In addition to an agrarian heritage, the colony families brought with them Midwest America's small-town values, institutional structures, and a well-planned city center reminiscent of their old hometowns in Minnesota, Wisconsin, and Michigan. Many of the structures built are now in a nationally recognized historic district. Construction of the statewide road system and the rapid development of Anchorage has fueled growth around Palmer. Many Palmer residents commute 45 minutes to work in Anchorage.

Geography

Palmer is located at  (61.601879, −149.117351).

It lies on the north shore of the Matanuska River, not far above tidewater, in a wide valley between the Talkeetna Mountains to the north and the Chugach Mountains to the south and east. East of Palmer is Lazy Mountain, and standing behind that is Matanuska Peak. Lazy Mountain, Matanuska Peak, and Pioneer Peak are all a part of the Chugach Range. North of Palmer are the Talkeetna Mountains.

Palmer and Wasilla are the two major old-town cores of the Matanuska-Susitna Valley. Population of the area has grown dramatically in the past decade; Borough officials estimate the local population at 8,000.

Apart from road access, Palmer can be accessed by the Palmer Municipal Airport and the Palmer Depot of the Alaska Railroad. Neither of these have regularly scheduled service. However, when the Alaska State Fair operates, the Alaska Railroad operates a special train from Anchorage to Palmer (though it does not operate in 2021).

Climate
Palmer has a subarctic climate (Köppen climate classification: Dsc). Despite this classification, the city receives noticeably more precipitation in summer, with August being the wettest month. However, April, one of the six warmer months is sufficiently drier than October and December, hence the letter 's' is used instead of 'f' (as in Dfc). 

Palmer has a climate similar to that of Anchorage, although with low temperatures that are on average  cooler and highs  warmer. On average, over the course of a year, there are 28–29 days of sub- lows, 22–23 days of + highs, and 0.8 days of + highs. Palmer is flanked by two glaciers, the Matanuska Glacier and the Knik Glacier. Wind blows through the Matanuska and Knik River Valleys into the town frequently. If there is a substantial snowfall, it will often sit for several days before most of it is blown away. These warm winds can raise winter temperatures for a couple days at a time, and are often called Chinook winds by the local people.

Demographics

As of the 2010 United States Census, there were 5,937 people, 1,472 households, and 1,058 families residing in the city. The racial makeup of the city was 80.9% White, 2.1% Black or African American, 8.2% Native American, 1.1% Asian, 0.3% Pacific Islander, 1.2% from other races, and 6.3% from two or more races. 3.5% of the population were Hispanic or Latino of any race. 14.9% were of German, 10.5% United States or American, 8.9% Irish and 8.7% English ancestry according to Census 2000.

There were 1,472 households, out of which 47.4% had children under the age of 18 living with them, 50.3% were married couples living together, 16.6% had a female householder with no husband present, and 28.1% were non-families. 23.0% of all households were made up of individuals, and 7.5% had someone living alone who was 65 years of age or older. The average household size was 2.81 and the average family size was 3.29.

In the city, the age distribution of the population shows 33.6% under the age of 18, 11.8% from 18 to 24, 28.7% from 25 to 44, 16.8% from 45 to 64, and 9.1% who were 65 years of age or older. The median age was 29 years. For every 100 females, there were 98.1 males. For every 100 females age 18 and over, there were 93.6 males.

The median income for a household in the city was $45,571, and the median income for a family was $53,164. Males had a median income of $44,716 versus $25,221 for females. The per capita income for the city was $17,203. About 6.0% of families and 12.7% of the population were below the poverty line, including 12.6% of those under age 18 and 4.2% of those age 65 or over.

Arts and culture

Alaska State Fair

Palmer is most noted in Alaska as the location of the annual Alaska State Fair, where Palmer's agricultural spirit lives on. The Alaska State Fair holds contests for largest vegetable in several categories, and many national and even world records have been recorded at the fair, with the cabbage, radish, spinach and lettuce categories usually dominating local interest. There are rides and festivities, local artists on display, local venders and food trucks, and popular musical artists at the ConcoPhilips Borealis Theatre.  In 2008, Scott Robb of Palmer won 1st place and a $2,000 prize for his   cabbage.

Palmer Museum of History and Art
Palmer hosts a log cabin Visitor Information Center in the heart of downtown that entertains more than 35,000 visitors each year. The Palmer Museum of History and Art is located in the Visitor Information Center and offers visitors a chance to view artifacts from Palmer's history, provides maps to historical places to see and stocks guidebooks for more information on local attractions.

The Church of a Thousand Trees
A couple of blocks away from the Visitor Information Center is the United Protestant Church (aka The Church of a Thousand Trees), a Presbyterian church. It was built in 1936–37 and is one of the 17 structures that contribute to the National Register's Matanuska Colony Historic District.

Friday Fling 
The Friday Fling is a local downtown Palmer event that takes place around the public library and train depot.

Parks and protected areas
Twelve miles north of Palmer is Hatcher Pass, a scenic mountainous pass. It has been established as a state park and is the home of the Independence Mine. It serves as a local back-country area for skiers, snowboarders, snowmachiners, and hikers as well as a tourist attraction in the summer months.

The area is also home to the Kepler-Bradley Lakes State Recreation Area, which grants access to numerous small lakes, the Finger Lake State Recreation Area, and a number of city parks.

Sports

The Mat-Su Miners, a franchise in the Alaska Baseball League, a high-level summer collegiate baseball league, play their games at Hermon Brothers Field on the State Fairgrounds. Colony High School bands play pep rally music, and different venders get together to bring a large crowd to support. With Division I collegiate players from all over the United States, the Miners have twice captured the coveted National Baseball Congress championship, in 1987 and 1997. Alaska Raceway Park is a nearby dragstrip. The Valley Steelers, a semi-pro football team within the Alaska Football League, play their home games at Palmer High School.

Education
Primary and secondary education in Palmer is a part of the Matanuska-Susitna Borough School District.  Within city limits, there are two elementary schools (Swanson Elementary and Sherrod Elementary), one middle school (Palmer Jr. Middle School) and one high school (Palmer High School). 

Palmer High is of a modest size, with about 900 students and approximately 60 staff members. In 1999, It became the first school in Alaska to offer the International Baccalaureate program. About ten minutes from Palmer are "cross-town" rivals, Colony Middle School and Colony High School.

Palmer is also home to Alaska Bible College, the state's only accredited school of theology and ministry, and Matanuska-Susitna College, an extended college of the University of Alaska Anchorage.

The Palmer Alaska Job Corps is at 800 E. Lynn Martin Drive, across from the Hageland airfield.

The Ya Ne Dah Ah School (YNDA School), operated by the Athabascan Nation Chickaloon Village, uses Alaska Native methods to teach children. It was established in 1992. It is funded with grant money. In 2012 the school did not receive an annual grant which would allow it to fund Athna language and cultural programs, and it failed to receive Bureau of Indian Affairs (BIA) funds since the BIA had a 1995 rule preventing it from funding Alaska Native programs.

Notable people

 Charlie Akers (1939-2016), Olympic biathlete
 Corey Cogdell (born 1986), two-time Olympic bronze medalist in trap shooting (2008, 2016); lifetime member of the National Rifle Association (NRA)
 Edna DeVries (born 1941), Borough Mayor of Matanuska-Susitna Borough.
 Anna Marly (1917–2006), Russian-French singer-songwriter; settled in Lazy Mountain where she became a citizen of the US; died in Palmer
 Ed Walker (1917–2011), last surviving member of Castner's Cutthroats, resided at Alaska Veterans and Pioneers Home in Palmer
 Talis J. Colberg (Born 1958), former Attorney General of Alaska

Sister cities
 Saroma, Hokkaido, Japan
On October 28, 1980, Palmer and Saroma agreed to a bilateral sister relation to promote cultural exchange and support a home-stay program for their residents. The relationship began with a friendship formed between Mr. Mutsuhiro Ishiguro, an English teacher at Saroma High School, and Palmer resident Edward Holmes.  They met over their ham radios, and over time formed a friendship.  Mr. Holmes eventually visited Saroma, which then led to a delegation from Saroma to Palmer, where they signed the sister city accords. Since that time, additional relationships have formed under the auspices of the town connection.
 Palmer High School with Saroma High School, established 1991
 Palmer Presbyterian Church with Saroma Christian Church

See also

 Matanuska Valley Colony

References

Sources
 Matanuska Valley Memoir: The Story of How One Alaskan Community Developed, by Hugh A. Johnson and Keith L. Stanton. Bulletin 18, 3rd edition, 1980. Originally published July 1955. Alaska Agricultural Experiment Station: Palmer, Alaska.

External links

 

Anchorage metropolitan area
Borough seats in Alaska
Cities in Alaska
Cities in Matanuska-Susitna Borough, Alaska
Populated places established in 1916